Arnold A. "Arnie" Knepper (October 10, 1930 – June 6, 1992), was an American racecar driver.

Born in Belleville, Illinois, Knepper also died there as from cancer.  He drove in the USAC Championship Car series, racing in the 1963-1972 seasons, with 75 career starts, including the 1965-1969 Indianapolis 500 races.  He finished in the top ten 21 times, with his best finish in 3rd position twice in 1966. Knepper earned a small place in Indianapolis lore when he crashed on the 87th lap of the 1969 Indianapolis 500, and instead of making the typical dash to trackside safety, stood up on his car and, facing 180-mph oncoming traffic,  frantically waved his arms to warn oncoming drivers of the danger.

Indianapolis 500 results

External links

 Arnie Knepper on Champ Car Stats
 

1930 births
1992 deaths
Burials in Illinois
Deaths from cancer in Illinois
Indianapolis 500 drivers
Sportspeople from Belleville, Illinois
Racing drivers from Illinois